The Federal Ministry of Environment is a ministry of the Federal Government of Nigeria created in 1999 with a mandate to address environmental issues and to ensure the effective coordination of all environmental matters in the country. As part of its vision and mission, the ministry sets out to ensure the control of environmental issues and the protection and conservation of natural resources. It also formulates policies and supervises activities for curbing desertification and deforestation, the management of flood, erosion and pollution, as well as climate change and clean energy.

Mohammed Hassan Abdullahi is the current Minister of Environment; he took charge of the affairs of the ministry in April, 2022 after he was redeployed by President Muhammadu Buhari from his post as Minister of State for Science, Technology, and Innovation. He took over from Sharon Ikeazor who was then the acting Minister.

Responsibilities 
The ministry plays various roles involving the national goals on desertification, deforestation, pollution, and waste management. It also superintends over climate change and clean energy issues and enforces environmental standards and regulations in different parts of the country. 

The ministry fulfills its responsibilities through its departments and parastatals. Some  of these parastatals include: National Biosafety Management Agency (NBMA), 
National Parks Service (NPS), National Agency for the Great Green Wall, National Oil Spill Detection and Response Agency (NOSDRA), and National Environmental Standards and Regulations Enforcement Agency (NESREA). 

The ministry also supervises and provides funding for research institutes such as the Forestry Research Institute of Nigeria (FRIN), and the Environmental Health and Registration Council of Nigeria (EHORECON), among others.

Past Ministers of Environment 

 Dr. Iyorchia Ayu
 Mrs. Helen Esuene
 Mrs. Halima Tayo Alao
 Mr. John Odey
 Mrs. Amina Mohammed
 Mr. Ibrahim Jibril
 Mohammad Mahmood Abubakar

Achievements of the Ministry 
One of the major achievements of the Federal Ministry of Environment is the initiation of the Ogoniland clean-up programme of the Nigerian government. Ogoniland is one of the communities in the oil-rich Niger Delta region that has been devastated by the exploration activities of oil producing companies. Other achievements of the ministry and its parastatals include the Clean and Green initiatives in the States of Nigeria, Great Green Wall Programme, and the Nigeria Erosion and Watershed Management Project.

See also 
 Nigeria Erosion and Watershed Management Project

References

Federal Ministries of Nigeria